The Agfa-Gevaert Tournament was a professional golf tournament that was played in Munich, West Germany from 1968 to 1971. It was founded by sponsors Agfa-Gevaert following the success of their British subsidiary's existing tournament in England, and was the last of three tournaments in West Germany played in consecutive weeks, following on from the German Open and the Woodlawn International Invitational. It was hosted at Munich Golf Club.

Winners

References

Golf tournaments in Germany
Agfa
Recurring sporting events established in 1968
Recurring sporting events disestablished in 1971